The Anawan Club Clubhouse and Caretaker's House are a pair of historic buildings in Rehoboth, Massachusetts, on the grounds of the Anawan Club, a private recreational club.

The clubhouse is a log building built in 1898 on the shore of Warren Upper Reservoir as a hunting and fishing lodge.  It was built from locally-cut cedar trees, and consists of a single large chamber flanked by fieldstone chimneys, with a small service ell.  The caretaker's house is a much older -story Cape style house, probably built between 1750 and 1780 by a member of the Kelton family.  It is a well-preserve local example of this vernacular form.

The property was added to the National Register of Historic Places in 1983.

See also
National Register of Historic Places listings in Bristol County, Massachusetts

References

Houses completed in 1898
Houses in Bristol County, Massachusetts
Buildings and structures in Rehoboth, Massachusetts
National Register of Historic Places in Bristol County, Massachusetts
Clubhouses on the National Register of Historic Places in Massachusetts
Houses on the National Register of Historic Places in Bristol County, Massachusetts